Pubborka is a village in Kamrup district surrounded by Kamalpur, Assam town. It is 35 km from Guwahati.

Transport 
Pubborka is accessible through National Highway 31. All major private commercial vehicles ply between Pubborka and Kamalpur.

See also 
 Guakuchi
 Ramdia

References 

Villages in Kamrup district